The Blizzard of January 1881 (17–20 January 1881) was one of the most severe blizzards ever to hit the southern parts of the United Kingdom.

On 17 January 1881, a low pressure system rapidly developed in the English Channel. The snowfalls began on the 17th in the southwest and as the system deepened as it moved through the Channel, a gale force easterly developed over southern parts with heavy blizzards and drifting snow. The blizzard paralysed all transport, communication, trade and industries. Hundreds of miles of rail track were blocked by drifting snow, dozens of feet high in places. Even in central London, there were 3-foot drifts in places. Around 100 people are believed to have died as a result of the blizzard. The storm was accompanied by extreme cold. Comparisons are drawn to the Great Blizzard of 1899 which affected the United States.

Temperatures 

The severity of the frosts was remarkable and they were probably second only to those that occurred during February 1895 in intensity and length. The Central England temperature for the period of 8th to 27th was -4.4C.

Note that, due to non-standard exposures, many of the contemporary reported temperatures are no longer accepted by the Meteorological Office.
Other low minima.
Canden Square: -11.2C (17th)
Hitchin: -15C (20th)
Banbury: -15C (20th)
Norwich: -17.2C (26th)
Barnastaple: -14.4C (22nd)
Bodmin: -13.3C (26th)
Manchester: -12.2C (17th, 26th)
Skipton: -18.9C (25th)
Llandudno: -9.7C (26th)
Braemar: -20C (17th)
Aberdeen: -15.6C (17th)
Cork: -13.3C (15th)
Waterford: -12C (17th)
Galway: -10.6C (17th)
Londonderry: -10C (22nd)
Omagh: -19.4C (23rd)

At Orleton, the maximum never got above -7.0C on the 25th. Rivers in the area had frozen over by the 15th.

Boston: 15 days the mean temp was -6.1C, 6.5 inches thick ice on river.

Haverfordwest: River Cleddan frozen over. A maximum of -7.8C on the 20th.

Killaloe: Large part of Lough Derg frozen over.

An aurora was widely seen over the UK on the 31st.

Reports from counties of snow depths 

From the Wirral to just north of Flamborough Head northwards, no snow fell from this storm although there was a deep cover of snow over a wide area. For instance, parts of the Lancashire plain had a general cover of 6 inches.

Specific towns and cities reports

References

Symons's Meteorological Magazine of 1881

1881 in England
1881 natural disasters
1881 disasters in the United Kingdom
Blizzards
Weather events in the United Kingdom
1881 meteorology
1881 in Wales
January 1881 events
European windstorms